This was the first edition of the tournament.

Unseeded German Mischa Zverev won the title, defeating Kristian Pless in the  final, 7–5, 7–6(8–6).

Seeds

Draw

Finals

Top half

Bottom half

References

External links
 Singles Draw
 Official ATP

Irish Open